Kirkby Fleetham is a village in the Hambleton District of North Yorkshire, England about  east of the A1(M) road. Along with the two nearby villages of Great Fencote and Little Fencote it forms the civil parish of Kirkby Fleetham and Fencote. At the 2011 census, it was recorded as having a population of 560.

History

There were two distinct villages named Kirkby and Fleetham at one time. Both are mentioned in the Domesday Book as Cherchebi and Fleetha both belonging to the lands of Count Alan of Brittany. The nearby hamlets of Gt and Lt Fencote are referred to in the Fleetham entry as the Fencotes. The lands of Fleetham before the Norman Conquest were owned by Gamli, son of Karli and Uhtred. After 1086 the manor was granted to Odo the chamberlain. The lands around Kirkby remained with Aldred (Eldred) throughout that time period. The name derives from a combination of kirkju-býr, Old Norse for village with a church, flēot the Old English for small stream and hām the Old English for farm.

The manor of Kirkby was passed to Aldred's son Gospatric, whose daughter Godareda succeeded to his lands, but a clear line of succession does not emerge again until William Giffard in the thirteenth century, whose demesne lordship subsequently lapsed. The demesne titles were then in the possession of the Stapleton family until 1514 when Sir Thomas Metham let the lands to the Conyers. The heirs of the Methen family sold the manor in 1600 to Leonard Smelt. On the death in 1740 of Leonard Smelt, the M.P. for Northallerton, the manor passed to the Aislabie family who, via the distaff side, held it until 1845. At the turn of the twentieth century it passed to the Courage family.

The manor of Fleetham passed to the Scrope family of Castle Bolton in the thirteenth century. It was passed down that line of descent via Lord Fauconberg and the Darcy family until 1670 when it was conveyed to Richard Smelt, younger brother of the then lord of Kirkby, thus uniting the two manors.

It is the site of moated manor house, built in about 1314, on the site of an earlier motte and bailey castle.

Community

The village has a Church of England Primary School. It is within the catchment area of Northallerton School for Secondary education to the age of eighteen. There is a local Pub/Bed & Breakfast called The Black Horse and the village has a Shop/Post office.

Governance and geography

The village lies within the Richmond UK Parliament constituency. It also lies within the Swale electoral division of North Yorkshire County Council and the Leeming Bar ward of Hambleton District Council.

The River Swale runs close to the village on the east side and the A1 motorway runs approx  to the west of the village. The village also lies under the landing flight path of RAF Leeming.

Demography (of civil parish area)

2001 Census

According to the 2001 UK Census, the parish was 46.5% male and 53.5% female of the total population of 486. The religious make-up was 79.2% Christian with the rest stating no religion. The ethnic distribution was 99.4% White with a small Chinese/Other Ethnic minority. There were 238 dwellings.

2011 Census

According to the 2011 UK Census, the parish had a total population of 560 with 48.75% male and 51.25% female. The religious make-up was 71.1% Christian with the rest stating no religion. The ethnic distribution was 98.4% White with a small Mixed Ethnic minority. There were 252 dwellings.

Religion

St Mary's parish church was built between the 12th and 15th centuries and was fully restored in 1871. It is a grade II* listed building and contains a monument by the sculptor John Flaxman to William Lawrence of Kirkby Fleetham Hall in the form of the bust of a young man with his mourning wife Anne Sophie. It has three bells and registers that go back to 1570.

Notable buildings

Kirkby Fleetham Hall

Kirkby Fleetham Hall is a grade II* listed 18th-century country house which stands a mile to the north of the village. The property was bought in the 1720s by John Aislabie (1670–1742), MP for Ripon and Chancellor of the Exchequer, for his son William Aislabie, also MP for Ripon. The present house was built in the mid-1700s by William for his daughter, Ann Sophie, who had married William Lawrence. Subsequently, it was left (with property in Clint), by William's granddaughter, Miss Sophia Elizabeth Lawrence (1761–1845), to her second-cousin once-removed, Harry Edmund Waller III, JP, DL (1804–1869), a direct descendant of Edmund Waller, thence to his son Edmund Waller VI (1828–1898), who sold it in 1889 to Edward Courage of the Courage brewing family. Since then much of the estate has been sold off. The hall has gone through several disguises including hotel and "country retreat".  It is currently privately owned with part let out as apartments.

Pictures of Kirkby Fleetham Hall

References

External links

Kirkby Fleetham School

Villages in North Yorkshire
Civil parishes in North Yorkshire